The Reinhold Zschiesche Tenement is a historical habitation building located at 1 Chocimska street, at the intersection with Gdańska Street in Bydgoszcz, Poland.

Location 
The building stands on the western side of Gdańska street, at the crossing with Chocimska Street.

It stands close to remarkable tenements in the same street, among others:
 Tenement at 91 Gdańska street;
 Hugo Hecht tenement at 92-94 Gdańska street;
 Carl Bradtke Tenement at 93 Gdańska street;
 Tenement at 95 Gdańska street;
 Stanisław Rolbieski tenement at 96 Gdańska street;
 Carl Peschel tenement at 101 Gdańska street.

History
The house was built between 1885 and 1886 for the dealer and restaurateur Reinhold Zschiesche, according to a project by Józef Święcicki.

In 1908, the ground floor housed a restaurant and pub, owned by Reinhold Zschiesche, with its entrance located at the corner of the building.

In the 1920s, in the backyard, Antoni Zurawski ran a trading company.

Architecture
Building's architecture has eclecticicism style, with plastic details, taken from the repertoire of Neo-Renaissance and Mannerism decoration forms.
The corner of the house is underlined by a two-storey bay window.

In the same area, Józef Święcicki also realized other edifices:
 Hotel "Pod Orlem" at 14 Gdańska Street;
 Oskar Ewald Tenement at 30 Gdańska Street;
 Józef Święcicki tenement at 63 Gdańska Street;
 Tenement at 86 Gdańska Street;
 Villa Hugo Hecht at 88-90 Gdańska Street;
 Hugo Hecht tenement at 92-94 Gdańska Street;
 Tenement at 1 Plac Wolności.

Gallery

See also

 Bydgoszcz
 Gdanska Street in Bydgoszcz
 Józef Święcicki
  Downtown district in Bydgoszcz

References

Bibliography 
 

Buildings and structures on Gdańska Street, Bydgoszcz